The Democratic Serb Party is a minor conservative political party in Montenegro, representing the Serbs of Montenegro.

History
The Democratic Serb Party was formed in 2003 following a split from the Serb People's Party led by Božidar Bojović, who was the first party president, and Ranko Kadić, first vice president and his subsequent successor.

At the legislative elections held in March 2009, DSS formed a pre-election coalition with the People's Party, but the coalition failed to gain parliamentary status, winning 2,9% of the votes, just below the 3% electoral threshold. At the next election DSS participated in a nationalist coalition Serb National Alliance along with Party of Serb Radicals and Serb National Alliance, which won only 0,85% of votes. In August 2016, the party joined the right-wing Democratic Front (DF) for the 2016 election, and supported ZBCG list for 2020 election.

Elections

Parliamentary election

References

Serb political parties in Montenegro
Conservative parties in Montenegro
Christian democratic parties in Montenegro
2003 establishments in Montenegro